The 2017–18 Duquesne Dukes women's basketball team will represent Duquesne University during the 2017–18 NCAA Division I women's basketball season. The Dukes were led by fifth year head coach Dan Burt. The Dukes were members of the Atlantic 10 Conference and play their home games at the Palumbo Center. They finished the season 25–5, 13–3 in A-10 play to finish in second place. They lost in the quarterfinals of the A-10 women's tournament to Saint Joseph's. They received an automatic trip to the Women's National Invitation Tournament where defeated Miami (OH) and Georgetown in the first and second rounds before losing to St. John's in the third round.

2017–18 media

Duquesne Dukes Sports Network
Alex Panormios and Tad Maurey provide the call for home games on A-10 Digital Network. Select games will be televised.

Roster

Schedule

|-
! colspan="9" style="background:#00214d; color:#c00;"| Non-conference regular season

|-
! colspan="9" style="background:#00214d; color:#c00;"| Atlantic 10 regular season

|-
! colspan="9" style="background:#00214d; color:#c00;"| Atlantic 10 Tournament

|-
! colspan="9" style="background:#00214d; color:#c00;"| WNIT

Rankings
2017–18 NCAA Division I women's basketball rankings

See also
 2017–18 Duquesne Dukes men's basketball team

References

Duquesne
Duquesne Dukes women's basketball seasons
Duquesne
Duquesne
Duquesne